The year 1564 in science and technology included many events, some of which are listed here.

Medicine
Ambroise Paré publishes his treatise on surgery, Dix livres de la chirurgie: avec le magasin des instrumens necessaires à icelle, in French.

Births
 February 15 – Galileo Galilei, Pisan astronomer (died 1642).
 March 9 – David Fabricius, Frisian astronomer (died 1617).
 approx. date – Pierre Richer de Belleval, French botanist (died 1632).

Deaths
 April – Pierre Belon, French naturalist (born 1517) (murdered)
 October 15 – Vesalius, Flemish anatomist (born 1514)
 October 18 – Johannes Acronius Frisius, German physician and mathematician (born 1520)
 Charles Estienne, French anatomist (born 1504)

References

 
16th century in science
1560s in science